Isidiella is a genus of moths in the family Cosmopterigidae.

Species
Isidiella divitella (Constant, 1885)
Isidiella labathiella (Viette, 1956)
Isidiella nickerlii (Nickerl, 1864)

References

Natural History Museum Lepidoptera genus database

Cosmopteriginae